Latona was launched at Whitby in 1789. She made one voyage for the British East India Company (EIC), one as a slave ship in the triangular trade in enslaved people, and one as a whaling ship in the southern whale fishery. She spent the rest of her career as a merchantman. She was wrecked in February 1842.

Career
Latona was launched in 1789 at Whitby. Although some records state 1790, this is when she was sold to London investors and registered there.

One source has suggested that it was a different  that made a voyage for the EIC. The data from Lloyd's Register supports that it was the Whitby Latona that made the voyage.

EIC voyage (1794-1795): 
On 3 June 1794 Captain Henry Christopher acquired a letter of marque. Before she was ready for a voyage for the EIC, Hill repaired her. Before Latona left England, the Court of Directors had agreed that she would be allowed to stop at Madeira.

On 25 June, Gilbert Ferguson and William Gillett certified to the EIC's Court of Directors that before she, and seven other vessels, had left the Thames, "everything was done, that in our opinion was necessary, to make them sufficiently strong to bring home a cargo from India".

Christopher sailed from Plymouth on 22 June. Latona reached the Cape of Good Hope on 8 October, and arrived at Calcutta on 15 February 1795. On her way home she reached St Helena on 5 August. On 3 September she sailed from St Helena. Latona arrived at The Downs on 25 November.

For reasons that are obscure as of February 2023, Latona disappeared from Lloyd's Register for several years. She was listed in Lloyd's Register in 1800 and in the Register of Shipping for 1800, the year in which this register started publication.

Enslaving voyage (1801–1802): In 1801 Captain John Smith made one enslaving voyage. He sailed from London on 22 November 1801. He acquired captives at Cape Coast Castle and Latona sailed from Africa on 29 April 1801. She arrived at Havana on 15 July with 283 captives. She arrived back at London on 7 October.

In 1803 she returned to the Jamaica trade.

 
Whaling voyage (1818–1820): Captain Donovan (or Denamon, or Dennaman, or Denniman) sailed from England on 30 January 1818, bound for the Isle of Desolation. She was at Desolation Island on 7 March 1819 and at the Galapagos in November. She returned to England on 5 October 1820.

The Register of Shipping last published in 1833. The data below are from Lloyd's Register

Fate
On 6 February 1842, Latona, Sutton, master, was coming from Alexandria when she struck the bar at Courtmacsherry, County Cork. She was driven ashore and wrecked.

The entry for Latona in the 1841 volume of Lloyd's Register is marked "wrecked".

Citations

References
Proceedings Relative to Ships Tendered for the Service of the United East-India Company, from the Twenty-sixth of March, 1794, to the Sixth of January, 1795: With an Appendix.
 
 

1789 ships
Ships built in Whitby
Age of Sail merchant ships of England
Ships of the British East India Company
London slave ships
Whaling ships
Maritime incidents in February 1842